NFL 2K2 is a video game released in 2001 for Dreamcast by Sega, and developed by Visual Concepts. It is the last game for the Sega Dreamcast in the series after being discontinued before Sega shifted to a third party publisher. Due to that, it was released later for PlayStation 2 and Xbox. It is the first Xbox game published by Sega. It is also the last game in the NFL 2K series to feature Randy Moss as a cover athlete.

The game along with the rest of the 2K titles on the Dreamcast have had their online components revived and are completely playable online.

Reception

The Dreamcast version received "universal acclaim", while the PlayStation 2 and Xbox versions received "generally favorable reviews", according to the review aggregation website Metacritic. Gary Whitta of Next Generation said of the Dreamcast version, "It's showing its age, but NFL2K2 can still compete with anything the next generation has to offer." In Japan, where the Dreamcast and PS2 versions were ported for release on March 28, 2002, Famitsu gave it a score of 29 out of 40 for the former, and 32 out of 40 for the latter.

GameSpot named NFL 2K2 a runner-up in its annual award category for the best traditional sports console game, which went to NBA 2K2. It was also nominated for the publication's "Best Dreamcast Game" award.

References

External links
 

Dreamcast games
PlayStation 2 games
Xbox games
NFL 2K video games
2001 video games
Sega video games
Video games developed in the United States